The Dolphin Centre was a swimming and leisure facility in Romford, in the London Borough of Havering, England.

History
Havering London Borough Council approved the design and £7.5 million construction of the Dolphin Centre in April 1980; it was named after a public house which existed in the nearby Romford Market from 1630 to 1900. When the centre was opened in April 1982, by Prince Richard, Duke of Gloucester, it had a state-of-the-art pyramid roof (the first of its kind in Europe). However, corrosion and the collapse of one of the panels in the roof led to it being draped with netting in 1990 to calm safety fears.

As well as the swimming pool, with its slides and wave machine, the Dolphin also contained a gymnasium and squash courts, and acted as a community functions centre for meetings, social events and exhibitions.

After thirteen years, the Dolphin Centre was closed to the public in April 1995 in the face of escalating operating costs and repayments on the finance lease. The site remained derelict until June 2003 when it was agreed to demolish the centre and build a new 15-storey residential tower block, providing over 200 new homes, above an Asda supermarket there. Demolition of the Dolphin Centre commenced in July 2004 and construction of the new development began in October 2004.

References

External links
 History of Romford: Dolphin Centre
 History of Romford: approval of the centre

Defunct sports venues in London
Sports venues in London
Former buildings and structures in the London Borough of Havering
Sports venues completed in 1982
Sports venues demolished in 2004
Romford
1982 establishments in England
Demolished sports venues in the United Kingdom